Ornézan is a commune in the Gers department in southwestern France.

Geography

Localisation 
Ornézan is located 16 km south of Auch and 2 km north of Seissan, along the Gers river.

Toponymy 
Ornézan finds its origin in the Latin patronymic name Ornatius, followed by the suffix -anum, designing a property of which a man named Ornatius must have been the owner in the times of Roman Gaul. The village is later known in Latin as Ornezanus and Ornesan in Gascon, before becoming Ornézan in French.

Government and politics

Mayors

Population

See also
Communes of the Gers department

References

Communes of Gers